Francisco Javier Cárdenas Pérez (born 18 May 1970) is a Spanish singer, television presenter, and radio presenter.

Radio
Cárdenas was nine years old when he began working on the radio program Peques Unic, on Radio Juventud. At 16, he began to broadcast football matches for Antena 3 Radio. He also collaborated on the show Arús con leche, directed by his brother-in-law Alfonso Arús. From 1990 to 1995, he broadcast football matches, both on Radio Club 25 and M80 Radio (on Cadena SER).

In 1997, he directed and presented Segundos Fuera on Radio España. There were a multitude of radio sketches, with the voices of the main characters of this country. He later developed this in the program "On the attack", Onda Rambla.

Since 2006, he has directed and presented the program Atrévete, in Cadena Dial, together with MJ Aledón, Isidro Montalvo, Roberto Alcaraz, Luis Rollán and others. According to the General Media Study (EGM), the Atrévete program is the second-fastest growing morning show in Spain.

In 2008 Cárdenas was awarded the Ondas Award for radio innovation for combining information, humor and entertainment, organizing a cruise during which a live radio was held over the weekend, with musical performances and competitions and with participation from the listeners.

In March 2008, he gave his listeners a cruise to the Principality of Monaco through the program Atrévete de Cadena Dial. Artists including Sergio Dalma, Conchita, Carlos Baute, Merche and Andy and Lucas joined the cruise. He repeated this in 2009 with the Cruise of the Daredoes.

The morning radio program Atrévete, directed and presented by Javier Cárdenas, achieved a record audience in Cadena DIAL in 2009, reaching 960,000 daily listeners.

On 15 July 2010 he made his last appearance on Atrévete; at this point it had more than 1,070,000 daily listeners.

In 2015, he was awarded the "Antena de Oro" award for the best radio presenter in Spain.

Cárdenas now works in the Europa FM chain, presenting and directing the morning show Levántate y Cárdenas. In 2010 the programme was reported as having a million listeners. In 2012 "Rise and Cardenas" exceeded one million listeners. Currently it is estimated that the number of listeners for the program Levántate y Cárdenas during the weekend is around two million.

Television
Cárdenas first appeared on television in the Força Barça program, which was broadcast in 1989 on TVE2.

In the 1992-1993 season he followed Arús in his passage through Antena 3, and became a reporter on the humor program Al ataque. His unusual interviews, especially with a clairvoyant named Carlos Jesus, attracted attention.

Cárdenas uses a caustic and ironic tone with his interviewees, with which he tries to expose the eccentricities of the character in question.

After collaborating on La Parodia Nacional (1996 and 1997) and receiving awards for the best television program on Antena 3 together with Constantino Romero, in 1997 he presented first-rate videos. Later, he participated in El candelabro (1999), directed by Tinet Rubira for Telecinco. He substituted for Jesús Vázquez in the mythical Gente con chispa program (2000 - 2001), and Nunca seremos, a cult program, both from Telemadrid.

In 2005 he was tried in Arona for lack of dignity of a disabled person interviewed. The appeal to the case was not made wait and through the resolution on the 19th of January 2010 absolution of the case is given to all involved, because before the interview, the aforementioned had given his approval to make use of it what was not It implied no abuse of their rights. In that instance, the court appointed the accusers to pay for the securities that involved the first confrontation. The fight did not end there and the accusing party, imputed to stronger instances, appealed to the Constitutional Court where finally, the ruling was in favor of the accusing party, giving the final opinion of perjury and derision to the interviewee.

After finishing Crónicas marcianas, he collaborated again with his brother Alfonso Arús and his sister Angie Cárdenas on Tan a gustito (2006) on TVE, setting challenges for celebrities.

In 2007, he presented the most important gala of the Cadena Dial music awards in Spanish for artists such as Chayanne, Paulina Rubio, Laura Pausini, Carlos Baute, Alejandro Sanz, Miguel Bosé, etc. for Cuatro y Autonómicas. In February 2008, he returns to repeat presentation of the gala of the most important awards of music in Spanish with artists such as Gloria Estefan, Juan Luis Guerra, Juanes, The 5th Station, Alejandro Fernández, Chambao, and others. Also in February 2008, he went on to direct and present on Localia TV The Eighth Commandment accompanied by Santiago Urrialde, Joaquín Prat Jr., MJ Aledón and Beatriz Jarrín, complemented by the reports of Urrialde himself and Miguel Martín, doing something unprecedented and having 400% more audience than the average of the chain with 90% less national coverage.

In June 2009, Antena 3 hired Cárdenas to co-present the afternoon program Tal cual with Cristina Lasvignes. On the third broadcast, he abandoned the program in the middle of the show, renouncing the multimillion-dollar contract he signed, since he did not accept to deal with issues related to the world of the heart. He also declined to present the end of year gala of 2009 in the regional channels.

Beginning in October 2016, he hosted the daily Hora punta (Rush Hour) in La 1 of TVE. In July 2018 it was announced that Hora punta will move to showing one program per week. However, by the end of 2018, the show was cancelled.

Film, books, music and others
In 1999, he participated in the short film by Aure Roces entitled Rondadores Nocturnos 2.

Cárdenas has published the books Benditos seáis todos (2000), in which he narrates his television experiences and the novel Acariciando un sueño (2002) with Martínez Roca.

In 2004, he writes, directs, produces and stars in the movie FBI: Frikis Wanna Incordiar (2004), which pretended to be an acid critique of certain characters who live off what is known as telebasura, and it was one of the 20 highest-grossing Spanish films of that year (€928098.74) (the ministry) occupying position 19 of the Spanish productions, also being one of the lowest budget (€200,000 ), (According to statements by another producer) although it was not in the reviews. This film has the peculiarity of being the first film in which reality and fiction are combined in equal parts. The film was nominated for the Godoy Awards, by itself was nominated in many categories and won in 8 of them (the Godoy Awards are the antithesis of the Goya Awards), Cárdenas won 4 of them.

In 2004, he recorded his first album: Siéntelo.

In February 2007 he presented the 2006 Dial Awards of the Cadena Dial radio station from the auditorium of Tenerife, delivering the most important awards of Latin music to Chayanne, Alejandro Sanz, Miguel Bosé, Paulina Rubio, Laura Pausini, Luis Fonsi, David Bisbal, Manuel Carrasco, Diego Martin, Álex Ubago, Yahir, Carlos Baute, David DeMaria, Malú,Nauzet and Antonio Carmona. Retransmitted for Spain by Cuatro y Autonómicas and live for all of Latin America.

In March 2008 he presented the 2007 Cadena Dial awards gala again from the auditorium of Tenerife for Spain for Cuatro y autonómicas, and live for all of Latin America where he once again presented the most important music awards in Spanish to Gloria Estefan, Juan Luis Guerra, Juanes, The Fifth Station, Chambao and Alejandro Fernandez, Andy & Lucas, David Bustamante, Conchita, Kiko & Shara, Luz Casal, Malú, Merche,Pastora Soler and Shaila Dúrcal.

On 5 December 2009 Javier Cárdenas presents the prestigious 10-year gala of Rolling Stone magazine, awarding the best artists of Spanish music such as Alejandro Sanz, Miguel Rios, Miguel Bosé, Marta Sánchez, Pereza, Loquillo, Manolo García, Leonor Watling, Macaco, Joan Manuel Serrat, etc.

In April 2010, the program directed by Javier Cárdenas has managed to pass the million listeners, practically doubling the best results of his previous predecessors. Placing the program Dare among the top 4 with the most audience in its time slot.

In May 2010, he received the Honorary Professor Diploma from the ESERP Business School, which reads as follows: "It expires Mr. Javier Cárdenas Pérez and his brilliant career, highlighting his work in the media and his analytical, executive and innovation capacity. journalistic that have enabled it to achieve the highest level of standing and professional projection. it is granted by unanimous agreement of the governing board the corresponding Honorary Professor.

In 2013, the Spanish Supreme Court condemns him for considering his attitude towards a disabled person interviewed in a TV5 report as burlesque. Despite the fact that, 11 years earlier, the case had been filed without penalty.

On 26 October 2016 he presented the project "A house, a life", a campaign that consisted of raffling his house to raise funds with the aim of contributing to the research of Idic15, a little-known disease in medicine. The project focused on the study of Mara's disease - a Valencian girl who suffers from the Idic15 syndrome. His father took a degree in medicine to investigate his daughter's illness, and after Cardenas had interviewed the man, he decided to draw his home in favor of the project, to finance a multidisciplinary research team at the University of Valencia.

The draw, organized by Lotteries State, took place in December 2016. As a result, the campaign achieved the 123,000 euros needed to fund research idic15.

References

External links 
 Página web
 Programa Levántate y Cárdenas
 Ficha de Javier Cárdenas en Europa FM
 Programa Atrévete en Cadena Dial 
 Javier Cárdenas y el Crucero de los Atrevidos de Cadena Dial
 Javier Cárdenas recibió el premio de “Profesor Honorario de ESERP Business School”

Male actors from Barcelona
Spanish male film actors
Spanish male television actors
Singers from Catalonia
Film directors from Catalonia
Writers from Catalonia
21st-century Spanish singers
20th-century Spanish writers
21st-century Spanish writers
Spanish radio personalities
1970 births
Living people